"In the Street" is a song by the American rock band Big Star. It was written by Chris Bell and Alex Chilton. The song was featured on the 1972 album #1 Record. The song was the B-side of their first single, "When My Baby's Beside Me." Lead vocals on "In the Street" were handled by Chris Bell.

Track listings and formats
 7" vinyl
 "In the Street"  – 2:55
 "When My Baby's Beside Me"  – 3:20

Cover versions
"In the Street" was recorded by Todd Griffin as "That '70s Song" with additional lyrics by Ben Vaughn as the theme song for the television sitcom That '70s Show. Another recording of "That '70s Song" by Cheap Trick was used as the theme beginning with season two.  The Cheap Trick version was released on the That '70s Album soundtrack album and another version by Cheap Trick was released on their album Authorized Greatest Hits.

References

Songs about streets
1972 songs
1972 singles
American rock songs
Songs written by Alex Chilton
Rock ballads
Big Star songs
Ardent Records singles
Cheap Trick songs
Comedy television theme songs
That '70s Show